Syncordulia legator  the guilded presba is a species of dragonfly in the family Corduliidae. It was first described by Dijkstra, Samways and Simaika in 2007. Syncordulia legator belongs to the genus Syncordulia, and family Corduliidae.

References 

Odonata of Africa
Insects of South Africa
Corduliidae